Peters House, also known as the Corner House Antique Store, is a historic home located in the Delaware Water Gap National Recreation Area at Lehman Township, Pike County, Pennsylvania.  It is a two-story, frame dwelling in two sections.  The older section dates to 1746.  Attached to it is an addition with three-story garage built in 1943.

It was added to the National Register of Historic Places in 1979.

References

Houses on the National Register of Historic Places in Pennsylvania
Houses completed in 1943
Houses in Pike County, Pennsylvania
National Register of Historic Places in Pike County, Pennsylvania